Haut Monde Mrs India Worldwide is an international beauty pageant for Indian married women that is conducted annually. It is organised by Haut Monde India Group since the year 2011, the parent company is Shri Sai Entertainment Pvt. Ltd., founded by Bharat Bhramar. The 2021 and 2022 finales happened in the UAE with participants from 21 countries. The first four seasons were hosted in India, then in Myanmar (2015), Dubai (2016), Vietnam (2017), Greece (2018 and 2019), and Ras Al Khaimah, UAE (2021 and 2022). The pageant is one of the longest-running and is the pioneer in the category of Indian-married women of substance worldwide.

Winners
List of winners from 2011 to 2022
2011 Jeemol Jubain
2012 Rebecca Ben
2013 Reshika Naikar
2014 Aman Grewal
2015 Drishti Bhanushali
2016 Poonam Shinde
2017 Neha Deshpande
2018 Saroj Mann
2019 Tarini Mukharjee
2021 Amisha Sethi
2022 Ruchika Malhotra

References

Beauty pageant hosts